Benjamin Tillman (1847–1918) was a U.S. Senator from South Carolina from 1895 to 1918. Senator Tillman may also refer to:

James D. Tillman (1841–1916), Tennessee State Senate
Jerry W. Tillman (born 1940), North Carolina State Senate
John N. Tillman (1859–1929), Arkansas State Senate

See also
Senator Tilghman (disambiguation)